Alan O'Neill (born 13 November 1937) is an English retired professional footballer who played in the Football League for Sunderland, Aston Villa, Plymouth Argyle and Bournemouth.

Career 
O'Neill played in the National Soccer League with Toronto Ukraina in 1971. Before his departure to the North American Soccer League he briefly played with NSL rivals Toronto Hellas.

In August 1971, O'Neill signed for New York Cosmos. Although listed as a goalkeeper by numerous sources, it appears his statistics have been confused with teammate Emmanuel Kofie, and rather than playing 11 games with no goals, he actually played three games, scoring once.

References

External links

1937 births
Living people
People from Leadgate, County Durham
Footballers from County Durham
English footballers
English Football League players
Association football inside forwards
Sunderland A.F.C. players
Aston Villa F.C. players
Plymouth Argyle F.C. players
AFC Bournemouth players
Cambridge United F.C. players
Southern Suburbs F.C. players
Chelmsford City F.C. players
Drumcondra F.C. players
Toronto Ukrainians players
New York Cosmos players
Vancouver Whitecaps (1974–1984) players
English expatriate footballers
English expatriate sportspeople in South Africa
Expatriate soccer players in South Africa
English expatriate sportspeople in Ireland
Expatriate association footballers in the Republic of Ireland
English expatriate sportspeople in Canada
Expatriate soccer players in Canada
English expatriate sportspeople in the United States
Expatriate soccer players in the United States
Canadian National Soccer League players
North American Soccer League (1968–1984) players